Barakai is one of the Aru languages, spoken by inhabitants of the Aru Islands.

References

Languages of Indonesia
Aru languages